The anime series television Bungo Stray Dogs focuses on individuals who are gifted with supernatural powers and use them for different purposes including holding a business, solving mysteries, and carrying out missions assigned by the mafia. The story mainly follows the members of the "Armed Detective Agency" and their everyday lives. It is produced by Bones was directed by Takuya Igarashi and written by Yōji Enokido.

A fourth season anime was announced on 7 November 2021. It premiered on 4 January 2023. Screen Mode performed the opening theme "True Story", and Luck Life performed the ending theme .


Episode list

References

Bungo Stray Dogs episode lists
2023 Japanese television seasons